Sherburn Colliery railway station served the village of Sherburn, County Durham, England from 1844 to 1959 on the Leamside line.

History 
The station opened as Sherburn on 19 June 1844 by the Newcastle & Darlington Junction Railway. The station was situated on the north side of the road bridge over the railway on Front Street, part of the B1283. Due to having two stations named Sherburn, the North Eastern Railway renamed this as Sherburn Colliery whilst Sherburn station the station on the Durham to Sunderland Line became . The goods facilities were south of the road bridge and east of the through lines. The 1913 NER statistics showed that barley and livestock were the principal goods handled at the station. Although the LNER intended to close the station in 1939, passenger services continued until 28 July 1941. The only services after passenger closure were excursions, including a school trip in 1951. The station closed to goods traffic on 14 September 1959.

References

External links 

Former North Eastern Railway (UK) stations
Railway stations in Great Britain opened in 1844
Railway stations in Great Britain closed in 1941
1844 establishments in England
1959 disestablishments in England